Shelton "Shelt" Carpenter (February 7, 1862, at Sutton, West Virginia – April 28, 1937) was an outdoorsman, fiddle player, and mountain folklife philosopher of note.  He is interred in the Braxton County Memorial Gardens Cemetery at Sutton, West Virginia.

References

Musicians from West Virginia
People from Sutton, West Virginia
Southern old-time fiddlers
1862 births
1937 deaths
Philosophers from West Virginia